The Fairchild AT-21 was an American World War II specialized bomber crew trainer, intended to train crews in the use of power gun turrets or a gun on a flexible mount, as well as learn to function as a member of a crew. It had a brief career as a training aircraft before modified bombers took over this role.

Design and development
The United States Army Air Corps (USAAC) issued a specification for a specialized bomber trainer, ordering two prototypes from Fairchild Aircraft. The XAT-13 powered by two  Pratt & Whitney R-1340-AN-1 radial engines, emerged as a "scaled down" bomber with a single machine gun in the glazed nose and a top turret with twin machine guns and fitted with tricycle landing gear. The concept was to have a single type that was able to duplicate the bomber crew positions from piloting, navigation, bomb aiming/dropping to aerial gunnery.

The second prototype, designated the XAT-14 was similar in layout but was powered by two 520 hp (388 kW) Ranger V-770 inline inverted 12-cylinder vee-type engines. It first flew in late 1942. A further refinement to suit the aircraft for bombardier training with the nose gun and turret removed, led to a new designation, the XAT-14A. Both prototypes featured an unusual construction, being built from "Duramold" plastic-bonded plywood. At the end of the testing period, the USAAC ordered the inline version as the AT-21 Gunner, specialized for gunnery training. The AT-21 had a crew of five, pilot, co-pilot/gunnery instructor and three pupils.

Fairchild Aircraft Company built one aircraft in Hagerstown and 106 aircraft at their Burlington, North Carolina plant in 1943 and 1944, while Bellanca Aircraft built 39 at New Castle, Delaware, and McDonnell built 30 aircraft at their St. Louis plant. Both companies were enlisted to speed production and delivery to training units.

Operational history
The AT-21 proved unsuitable for use as a trainer due to vibration and oscillation tendencies, as well as an inherent instability caused by the short distance between the rudders and the gull wing. The aerodynamic instability resulted in unacceptable yaw when even slight rudder movements were made.

Deemed unsuitable for its original purpose, the AT-21 was evaluated as an advanced pilot trainer. This also did not work out well, due to poor single-engine performance and multiple landing gear problems. The aircraft was withdrawn from service in 1944 and was replaced in training by examples of the actual aircraft in which the gunners would eventually serve. Many AT-21s were then relegated to target-tow duties.

A small number of  AT-21s survived as civilian examples, with one (s/n 42-48053 owned by Craig Cantwell) still in existence in North Texas awaiting restoration.

BQ-3 Assault Drone

In October 1942, the U.S. Army Air Forces ordered two XBQ-3 "aerial torpedoes", based on the AT-21 design. Optionally piloted for flight testing and intended to carry  of explosive, the XBQ-3 first flew in July 1944, but the project was cancelled later that year.

Variants
XAT-13
Twin-engined bomber crew trainer powered by two  Pratt & Whitney R-1340-AN-1 engines, one built, serial number 41-19500
XAT-14
AT-13 variant with two  Ranger V-770-6 engines, one built, later converted to XAT-14A, serial number 41-19503
XAT-14A
XAT-14 modified as a bombardier trainer with dorsal turret and nose gun removed.
AT-21
Production version of the XAT-14A with two 520 hp (388 kW) Ranger V-770-11 or -15 engines, 164 built.
XBQ-3
Guided bomb version, AT-21 modified with a  explosive charge in fuselage.

Operators

 United States Army Air Forces

Specifications (AT-21)

See also

References

Notes

Bibliography
 Andrade, John M. U.S. Military Aircraft Designations and Serials since 1909. Hinckley, England: Midland Counties Publications, 1979, .
 Eden, Paul and Soph Moeng, eds. The Complete Encyclopedia of World Aircraft. London: Amber Books Ltd., 2002. .
 Mondey, David. American Aircraft of World War II (Hamlyn Concise Guide). London: Bounty Books, 2006. .
 Swanborough, F.G. and Peter M. Bowers. United States Military Aircraft Since 1909. New York: Putnam, 1964. .
 Taylor, Michael J.H. Jane's Encyclopedia of Aviation Vol. 3''. London: Studio Editions, 1989. .

External links
 Apparatus For Molding Wood or the Like Material – patent for the construction method used to build the AT-21, featuring a drawing of the airplane

AT-21
1940s United States military trainer aircraft
World War II trainer aircraft of the United States
Low-wing aircraft
Aircraft first flown in 1943
Twin piston-engined tractor aircraft